Schantzenfeld is a hamlet in Saskatchewan, Canada. There are 2 small businesses located in Schantzenfeld.

Unincorporated communities in Saskatchewan
Swift Current No. 137, Saskatchewan